Marion Bartoli was the defending champion, but lost in the semifinal to Tamira Paszek.

Paszek went on to win the title, defeating Angelique Kerber in the final 5–7, 6–3, 7–5. Paszek saved five championship points in the final against Kerber before winning the title.

Seeds

Draw

Finals

Top half

Bottom half

Qualifying

Seeds

Qualifiers

Lucky loser
  Andrea Hlaváčková

Draw

First qualifier

Second qualifier

Third qualifier

Fourth qualifier

References
 Main Draw
 Qualifying Draw

Aegon International - Singles
2012 Women's Singles